Abdirahman Saeed Hassan (born April 13, 1997) is a Qatari athlete who specializes in the 800m and 1500m.

Abdirahman Saeed Hassan gained his first experience in international championships at the 2019 Asian Championships in Doha, where he finished fourth over 800 meters in 1:47.71 minutes. In the 1500m, he also qualified for and ran in the 2019 IAAF World Athletics Championships in Doha.

In May 2021, Hassan met the qualifying standard and secured a spot at the delayed 2020 Tokyo Olympic Games in the men’s 1,500m event with a personal best in 3:34.24 for a second place finish at the Enrique López Cuenca Stadium in Nerja, Malaga. He competed at the Olympics however did not finish his race.

Personal bests
Outdoor
800 metres – 1:45.33 (Marseille 2021)
1500 metres – 3:34.24 (Nerja 2021)
Indoor
1500 metres – 3:44.85 (Luxembourg 2020)

References

Qatari male middle-distance runners
Living people
1997 births
Athletes (track and field) at the 2020 Summer Olympics
Olympic athletes of Qatar